During the 2006–07 season Peterborough United played in Football League Two, the fourth tier of the English football pyramid. They had finished the previous season of Football League Two in 9th position.

Keith Alexander started the season as manager but was sacked in January 2007 after a run of poor form. Darren Ferguson was appointed as player-manager for the club, but by the end of the season the club only managed to finish in 10th place.

Peterborough managed to achieve a run in the FA Cup following victories over Rotherham United in the first round and Tranmere Rovers in the second round. The were eliminated in the third round by Plymouth Argyle after a defeat in a replay in Home Park. 

In the League Cup Peterborough defeated Ipswich Town on penalties in the first round before losing narrowly 2–1 to Everton in the second round.

Kit Profile

| 
|

First-team squad

Friendly matches

Competitions

League Two

League table

Matches

FA Cup

Football League Cup

Football League Trophy

Statistics

Goal scorers

Cards

See also
 2006–07 Football League

References

Peterborough United F.C. seasons
Peterborough United